Kakuhestan (also Romanized as Kākūhestān; also known as Kakostan) is a village in Dastjerd Rural District, Alamut-e Gharbi District, Qazvin County, Qazvin Province, Iran. At the 2006 census, its population was 259, in 51 families.

Notes 

Populated places in Qazvin County